The austral negrito or Patagonian negrito (Lessonia rufa) is a species of bird in the family Tyrannidae. It breeds in Argentina and Chile, migrating north as far as Bolivia, southern Brazil, Paraguay and Uruguay. It is a vagrant to the Falkland Islands and the South Georgia and the South Sandwich Islands territory. It has also been seen in the South Shetland Islands. Its natural habitats are freshwater lakes and saline marshes. It is primarily insectivorous but can eat algae.  It hunts in grassland environments with short grass. It perches and moves throughout foliage such as shrubs in order to find prey.

Taxonomy
The austral negrito was formally described in 1789 by the German naturalist Johann Friedrich Gmelin in his revised and expanded edition of Carl Linnaeus's Systema Naturae. He placed it with the larks in the genus Alauda and coined the binomial name Alauda rufa. The specific epithet is from Latin rufus meaning "red", "ruddy" or "rufous". Gmelin based his description on "L'alouette noire à dos fauve" from Buenos Aires that had been described in 1778 by the French polymath, the Comte de Buffon and illustrated with a hand-coloured engraving by François-Nicolas Martinet. The austral negrito is now placed together with the Andean negrito in the genus Lessonia that was introduced in 1832 by William Swainson. The species is monotypic: no subspecies are recognised.

References

austral negrito
Birds of Chile
Birds of Patagonia
austral negrito
austral negrito
Taxonomy articles created by Polbot